Franco Cribiori (born 28 September 1939) is an Italian former racing cyclist and cycling manager who had a career as a cyclist from 1960 to 1968 and then a career as a manager from 1969 to 1989. Cribiori was born in Corsico.

Palmarès

External links 

1939 births
Living people
Italian male cyclists
Cyclists from the Metropolitan City of Milan
Directeur sportifs